Macular corneal dystrophy, also known as Fehr corneal dystrophy named for German ophthalmologist Oskar Fehr (1871-1959), is a rare pathological condition affecting the stroma of cornea. The first signs are usually noticed in the first decade of life, and progress afterwards, with opacities developing in the cornea and attacks of pain. The condition was first described by Arthur Groenouw in 1890.

Signs and symptoms 
Onset occurs in the first decade, usually between ages 5 and 9. The disorder is progressive, vision changes with ageing from 2nd decade to 3rd visual impairment may seen in 4th and 5th decade severe visual impairment can be seen Minute, gray, punctate opacities develop. Corneal sensitivity is usually reduced. Painful attacks with photophobia, foreign body sensations, and recurrent erosions occur in most patients. Macular corneal dystrophy is very common in Iceland and accounts for almost one-third of all corneal grafts performed there.

Genetics 
Macular corneal dystrophy is inherited in autosomal recessive fashion and is thought to be caused by the lack or abnormal configuration of keratan sulfate. Most cases of MCD are caused by mutations in CHST6 gene.

The gene CHST6 is a carbohydrate sulfotransferase encoding an enzyme designated corneal N-acetylglucosamine-6-sulfotransferase. In MCD type I, various mutations lead to inactivation of the enzyme, in MCD type II, inactivation is caused by large deletions and/or replacements in the gene.

Diagnosis

Treatment 
Corneal transplantation is often required.

See also 
 Corneal dystrophy

References

External links 

Disorders of sclera and cornea